Nikolai Dimitrievich Dabić (also spelled Dabitch or Dabich; Kherson, Imperial Russia, 23 April 1857 – Kherson, Imperial Russia, 1908) was a Russian vice-admiral, a highly accomplished commander of the Imperial Russian Navy, decorated numerous times for valor in the Russo-Japanese War. He was of Serbian origin.

Naval career
The Dabić family had several officers in the Russian military, the most prominent among them is Vice-Admiral Nikolai Dimitrievich Dabić. Nikolai's great grandfather was sergeant major Zaharije Dabić, who in February 1754 is mentioned as living in the newly-established Russian province Slavo-Serbia under commanders Rajko Depreradović and Jovan Šević. Vice-Admiral Nikolai Dimitrievic Dabić was born in Kherson on 23 April 1857. His brother was Aleksandar Dimitrievich Dabić (1855 - 1880), a lieutenant in the navy. Dabić entered the Imperial Russian Navy at the age of 12. He was educated at the prestigious N. G. Kuznetsov Naval Academy in Saint Petersburg, and in 1877 was promoted to michman. He became a senior lieutenant on 17 January 1882. In January 1891 he was in command of Zorka. He was promoted to Captain 2nd rank on 28 March 1893. He was in command of the Russian monitor Admiral Spiridov, from 6 December 1895 and on, cruisers Afrika, from 6 December 1898 and on, Yaroslav 2 (ex-Evropa), from 13 September 1900 and on, and Gromoboi, from 1902 to 1906 in the Far East service. He was promoted to Captain 1st rank on 17 April 1901. He participated in the Russo-Japanese War as commander of the ironclad Russian cruiser Gromoboi (Thunderer). In a battle with the Japanese on 1 August 1904, he was seriously wounded and received an award for bravery. Because of the courage exhibited in battle by everyone aboard, the greatest praise of all belonged to Captain Dabić of the Gromoboi

for setting an example while wounded under fierce barrage shelling by the superior Japanese force. He was again awarded medals of valor. Dabić was promoted to flag rank as rear-admiral on 5 March 1907. Promoted to the rank of vice-admiral the following year (20 October 1908), he was placed on the Retired List at his own request, owing to wounds sustained in the Russo-Japanese War.

He died in 1908.

Awards
 Order of Saint George IV degree (awarded on 27 September 1904), 
 Order of St. Vladimir III and IV, 
 Order of St. Anna II and III degree,  
 Order of St. Stanislav II and III level. 
In addition, Dabić was awarded the Prussian Order of the Red Eagle III level.

See also
 Matija Zmajević
 Marko Voinovich
 Marko Ivelich
 Nilolai Kuznetsov

Notes
 Translated and adapted the Dabich biography from the Russian website
 Photograph of Nikolai Dimitrievich Dabić

References

1857 births
1908 deaths
Military personnel  from Kherson
Russian vice admirals
Recipients of the Order of St. George of the Fourth Degree
Recipients of the Order of St. Anna, 2nd class
Recipients of the Order of St. Anna, 3rd class
Recipients of the Order of St. Vladimir, 3rd class
Recipients of the Order of St. Vladimir, 4th class
Recipients of the Order of Saint Stanislaus (Russian), 2nd class
Recipients of the Order of Saint Stanislaus (Russian), 3rd class